The 2020–21 National First Division (called the GladAfrica Championship for sponsorship reasons) was the season from November 2020 to May 2021 of South Africa's second tier of professional soccer, the National First Division.

Teams

16 teams competed in the season.

Stadium and Locations

Table
<onlyinclude>

Play-offs

The playoffs were won by Chippa United, who retained their place in the 2021-22 South African Premier Division.  Royal AM refused to participate, instead buying their way into the top tier by purchasing the franchise of Bloemfontein Celtic.

See also
2020-21 South African Premier Division

References

External links
PSL.co.za

National First Division seasons
South
2020–21 in South African soccer leagues